Selections from Road to Utopia is a studio album of phonograph records by Bing Crosby released in 1946 featuring songs that were presented in the American musical comedy film Road to Utopia. However, the song "Road to Morocco" came from the film of the same name and was not actually used in Road to Utopia. Another song - "Goodtime Charlie" - was sung by Crosby and Bob Hope in the film but was not commercially recorded. The songs "Would You?" and "Personality" were sung by Dorothy Lamour in the film, not Crosby.

Track listing
These newly issued songs were featured on a 3-disc, 78 rpm album set, Decca Album No. A-423. All songs written by Jimmy Van Heusen (music) and Johnny Burke (lyrics).

References

Bing Crosby albums
1946 albums
Decca Records albums